Ahmed Abid Ali Mohammed known as Kobi (born 1 January 1986 in Iraq) is an Iraqi former football midfielder.

Honours

Country 
 2006 Asian Games Silver medallist.
 2007 Asian Cup winners

External links
 

1986 births
Living people
Iraqi footballers
Iraq international footballers
2007 AFC Asian Cup players
AFC Asian Cup-winning players
Al-Zawraa SC players
Erbil SC players
Duhok SC players
Amanat Baghdad players
Talaba SC players
Sportspeople from Baghdad
Association football midfielders
Asian Games medalists in football
Footballers at the 2006 Asian Games
Asian Games silver medalists for Iraq
Medalists at the 2006 Asian Games